Ernest Adolphus Sturge, M.D., Ph.D. (April 29, 1856 – October 11, 1934) was a physician and Presbyterian missionary who built hospitals in Asia. From 1886 to 1934 he was the General Superintendent of the Japanese Presbyterian Church.

Biography
He was born on April 29, 1856 in Cleveland, Ohio to Adolphus Sturge (1823-1894) and Caroline Harper (1822-1915). In 1867 his family moved to Bridgeton, New Jersey.

He received an M.D. and Ph.D. degree from the University of Pennsylvania in 1880.

In 1886, he was appointed as the superintendent of Japanese missions by the Presbyterian church.

In 1904 he received the Order of the Rising Sun from Emperor Meiji.

He died on October 11, 1934 in San Francisco.

References

Works
The Spirit of Japan: With Selected Poems and Addresses (1923)

External links

1856 births
1934 deaths
American Presbyterian missionaries
Physicians from New Jersey
Perelman School of Medicine at the University of Pennsylvania alumni
People from Bridgeton, New Jersey
Recipients of the Order of the Rising Sun
American expatriates in Japan
Presbyterian missionaries in Japan
Christian medical missionaries
Healthcare in Japan